Miyuki Fukumoto (née Aoyama; born 4 January 1977) is a female high jumper from Japan. Her personal best jump is 1.92 metres, achieved in July 2004 in Osaka.

She won the silver medal at the 2003 Asian Championships, and finished fifth at the 2006 Asian Games. She was the Japanese national high jump champion in 2006. She competed at the 2007 World Championships without reaching the final.

International competitions

References

1977 births
Living people
Japanese female high jumpers
Asian Games competitors for Japan
Athletes (track and field) at the 2006 Asian Games
Athletes (track and field) at the 2014 Asian Games
World Athletics Championships athletes for Japan
Japan Championships in Athletics winners
Australian Athletics Championships winners
20th-century Japanese women
21st-century Japanese women